This is an incomplete list of titles in the Home University Library of Modern Knowledge:
(series number in brackets where known)

A to D

 Ancient Art and Ritual by Jane Ellen Harrison (70)
 The Ancient East by David George Hogarth
 Ancient Greek Literature by Maurice Bowra
 The Animal World by Frederick William Gamble (12)
 An Anthology of English Poetry: Wyatt to Dryden by Mrs. F. E. A. Campbell (134)	
 Anthropology by R.R. Marett
 Architecture by Martin S. Briggs	
 Astronomy by Arthur R. Hinks (23)
 Banking by Walter Leaf
 Belgium by R. C. K. Ensor (95)
 The British Empire by Basil Williams (129)	
 British Prehistory by Stuart Piggott	
 The Byzantine Empire by Norman H. Baynes (114)
 Canada by Arthur Granville Bradley (34)
 Chaucer and his times by Grace E. Hadow (81)	
 Christianity by Edwyn Bevan	
 The Church of England by Edward William Watson, 1914.
 The Civilization of China by H. A. Giles (19)
 The Civilization of Japan by J. Ingram Bryan (127)
 The Civilization of Spain by J.B. Trend	
 Climate and Weather by Henry Newton Dickson
 Commercial Geography by Marion I. Newbigin (105)
 Communism by Harold J. Laski
 Comparative Religion by J. Estlin Carpenter (60)
 Conservatism by Hugh Richard Heathcote Cecil
 Co-partnership and Profit-sharing by Aneurin Williams
 Dante by Jefferson B. Fletcher (101)
 The Dawn of History by Sir John Linton Myres (26)
 Diplomacy by Harold George Nicolson 
 Dr. Johnson and His Circle by John Bailey (59)
 Drama by Ashley Dukes (117)

E to I

 Egypt by E. A. Wallis Budge (110)
 Electricity by Gisbert Kapp (53)
 Elizabethan Literature by J. M. Robertson (89)
 England under the Tudors and Stuarts, 1485-1688 by Keith Feiling (120)	
 English Constitutional History by S.B. Chrimes (199)	
 The English Language by Logan Pearsall Smith (40)
 English Literature: Medieval by W.P. Ker (45)
 English Literature: Modern by G.H. Mair	
 English Philosophy Since 1900 by G.J. Warnock	
The English Reformation to 1558 by T. M. Parker
 The English Revolution 1688–1689 by G. M. Trevelyan (188)
 The English Village by William Pearson Baker
  by G.E. Moore (52)	
 Eugenics by A.M. Carr-Saunders	
  by Gilbert Murray (73)
 Evolution by J. Arthur Thomson and Patrick Geddes	(14)
 The Evolution of Plants by Dukinfield Henry Scott (9)
 Exploration of the Alps by Arnold Lunn (86)
  by Hilaire Belloc (3)
 Gas and Gases by R. M. Caven (119)
 Germany of To-day by Charles Tower (72)
 Great Writers of America by William Peterfield Trent and John Erskine (48)
 The Growth of Europe by Grenville A. J. Cole (84)
 THe History of England by A. F. Pollard (33)
 History of England, 1688-1815 by E.M. Wrong (121)
 History of England, 1815-1939 by James Butler (128)
  by J.B. Bury (74)
 History of Our Time, 1885-1911 by G.P. Gooch (also 1885-1913 and 1885-1914) (20)
 History of Scotland by Robert Rait
 The Human Body by Arthur Keith
 The Industrial Revolution, 1760-1830 by T.S. Ashton	
 An Introduction to Mathematics by Alfred North Whitehead (21)
 Irish Nationality by Mrs J.R. Green, 1911. (6)

J to N

 Jesus of Nazareth by Charles Gore
 Karl Marx: His Life and Environment by Isaiah Berlin (189)
 Landmarks in French Literature by G. L. Strachey (31)
 Latin America by William R. Shepherd
  by L.T. Hobhouse
 The Literature of Japan by J. Ingram Bryan
 The Literature of Germany by J. G. Robertson (64)
 The Literature of the Old Testament by George Foot Moore
 The Making of the Earth by John Walter Gregory (54)
 Man: A History of the Human Body by Arthur Keith (56)	
 Master Mariners by John R. Spears (51)
 Matter and Energy by Frederick Soddy (43)	
 Medieval England, 1066-1485 by Sir Maurice Powicke
 Medieval English Literature by W. P. Ker (45)
 Medieval Europe by H. W. C. Davis (13)
 Milton by John Bailey (97)
 Modern English Literature by G. H. Mair (27)
 Modern Geography by Marion Newbigin (7)	
 Mohammedanism by D.S. Margoliouth	
 Music by W.H. Hadow (109)	
 Napoleon by H.A.L. Fisher (57)
 The Navy and Sea Power by David Hannay (94)
 The Negro by W.E. Burghardt Du Bois	
 The Newspaper by G. Binney Dibblee (58)
 Nineteenth Century European Civilization by Geoffrey Bruun

O to P

 The Ocean: A General Account of the Science of the Sea by Sir John Murray (76)
 The Opening Up of Africa by H. H. Johnston (18)
 Our Forerunners by M. C. Burkitt
 An Outline of Russian Literature by Maurice Baring (99)
 Painters and Painting by Frederick Wedmore (62)
 The Papacy and modern times by William Francis Barry (22)
 Parliament: Its History, Constitution and Practice, by Courtenay Peregrine Ilbert, 1911. (1)
 Patriotism in Literature by John Drinkwater (106)
 Peoples and Problems of India by T. W. Holderness (36)
 The Philosophy of Aristotle by Donald James Allan, 1952. (222)
 The Poet Chaucer by Nevill Coghill	
 Poland by W. Alison Phillips (100)
 Polar Exploration by William S. Bruce (8)
 Police by John Coatman	
 Political Consequences of the Great War by Ramsay Muir
 Political Thought in England, 1848-1914 by Sir Ernest Barker (104)
 Political Thought in England from Bacon to Halifax by G.P. Gooch	
 Political Thought in England from Locke to Bentham by Harold Laski
 Political Thought in England: Tyndale to Hooker by Christopher Morris, 1953. (225)
 Political Thought in England: The Utilitarians from Bentham to Mill by William Leslie Davidson, 1915.
 Practical Ethics by Herbert Louis Samuel, 1st Viscount Samuel
  by Robert Munro, 1913. (82)
 The Principles of Physiology by John Gray McKendrick (42)
  by Bertrand Russell, 1912. (35)
 Psychical research by Sir William Fletcher Barrett (24)
 Psychology by William McDougall (41)

Q to Z

 Religion and Science by Bertrand Russell	
 Religious Development Between the Old and New Testaments by Robert Henry Charles
 The Renaissance by Edith Sichel (87)	
 Rome by W. Warde Fowler (30)	
 Science in Antiquity by Benjamin Farrington	
 The Science of Wealth by J.A. Hobson
 Serbia by L. F. Waring (102)
 Shakespeare by Peter Alexander
 Shelley, Godwin, and Their Circle by Henry Noel Brailsford (75)
 A Short History of War and Peace by G.H. Perris, 1911. (4)
 The socialist movement by James Ramsay MacDonald, 1911. (10)
 Statistics by L.H.C. Tippett
 St. Paul by Arthur Darby Nock (186)
 The Study of Geography by John M. Mogey, 1950. (214)
 Town and Country Planning by Patrick Abercrombie (163)
 The Victorian Age in Literature by G. K. Chesterton (61)
 Wales by W. Watkin Davies (108)
 Warfare in England by Hilaire Belloc
 The Wars Between England and America by T.C. Smith, 1914. (82)
 The Wealth of England from 1496 to 1760 by Sir George Clark
 William Blake by H.M. Margoliouth, 1951.
 William Morris: His Work and Influence by A. Clutton Brock (83)
 William Shakespeare by John Masefield
 Wordsworth and Coleridge 1795-1831, H.M. Margoliouth, 1953. (223)
 World History from 1914 to 1950 by David Thomson, 1954.
 Writing English Prose by William T. Brewster (66)

References

Series of non-fiction books
Oxford University Press books